Maybe It's Me is Treble Charger's third album, released in 1997. The album featured three hit singles: "Friend of Mine", "How She Died" and a re-recorded version of "Red" (from NC17).

The album was a major breakthrough for Treble Charger. It was also their most well received album, and gave the band their first entry into the top 10 Canadian Indie Rock bands. The album also reached gold status in Canada, with sales of over 50,000 copies.

A live version of the song "Scatterbrain" was featured on MuchMusic's live compilation album, Much at Edgefest '99.

Track listing 
All songs written by Treble Charger.

 "Friend of Mine" – 3:46
 "How She Died" – 3:18
 "Stupid Thing to Say" – 3:09
 "Kareen" – 4:22
 "Red" – 4:41
 "Fade" – 4:06
 "Ever She Flows" – 3:54
 "Forever Knowing" – 4:13
 "Mercury Smile" – 3:37
 "Christ is on the Lawn" – 4:23
 "Scatterbrain" – 3:50
 "Takes Me Down" – 3:18
 "Left Feeling Odd" – 3:16

Credits 
 Treble Charger  -  Art Direction
 Greig Nori     -  Synthesizer, Guitar, Vocals, Slide Guitar, Farfisa Organ
 Rosie Martin   -  Synthesizer, Bass guitar, Piano, Vocals (background), Farfisa Organ, Pedals
 Bill Priddle   -  Guitar, Vocals, Vocals (background), Mellotron
 Mike Levesque      -  drums for tracks 1-6, 8, 11-12
 Morris Palter      -  Drums for tracks 7,9, 10 and 13
 Trevor MacGregor   -  Drums (only for the music videos.  Credited as a member of the band in the booklet/insert.)
 Colleen Allen       - 	Saxophone (tenor)
 Stephen Donald      - 	Trombone
 Matthew Ellard      -  Assistant Engineer
 Lou Giordano        -  Producer, guitar, mixing
 Jed Hackett         - 	Assistant Engineer
 Helios              -  Art Direction, Design, Photography, Illustrations
 Jack Hersca         -  Assistant Engineer
 Ted Jensen          -  Mastering
 Pete Karam          -  Assistant Engineer
 Tom Lord-Alge       -  Mixing
 Sarah McElcheran    -  Trumpet
 Michael Murphy      -  Art Direction
 Dave Tedesco        -  Assistant Engineer
 Roberto Toledo      -  Assistant Engineer

In pop culture 
 "How She Died" was featured on Halloween, an episode of Buffy the Vampire Slayer.

References 

1997 albums
Treble Charger albums
Albums produced by Lou Giordano